The Puerto Edén Igneous and Metamorphic Complex is a large coherent but varied geologic complex of metamorphic and igneous rocks that crops out in the Fjords and channels of Chile of the Magallanes Region. The rocks of the complex include migmatites, plutonic rocks and high-grade metamorphic rocks. To the west the Puerto Edén Igneous and Metamorphic Complex bounds the South Patagonian Batholith. Mineralogical observations and geothermobarometric calculations indicate high-temperature and low-pressure conditions (ca.  and 3 to 4.5 kbar) for an event of metamorphism and partial melting of metapelites in the Late Jurassic (previously determined by SHRIMP U–Pb zircon ages).

References

Bibliography 
 

Geology of Magallanes Region
Última Esperanza Province
Metamorphic complexes
Lithodemic units of Chile